Rafeket Binyamini (born 15 September 1964) is an Israeli former professional tennis player. Now working as a coach, she is a manager for the Israel Tennis Center.

Born in Tel Aviv, Binyamini was a national champion in both the 16s and 18s age groups. She won Israel's senior championships in 1981 and made her debut that year for the Federation Cup team. In a four-year Federation Cup career she featured in 11 ties and won six singles matches, which included beating Brazil's Cláudia Monteiro.

Binyamini, a Maccabiah Games medalist for Israel, played U.S. collegiate tennis in San Diego for United States International University. She achieved All-American honours and a best collegiate ranking of 15.

See also
List of Israel Fed Cup team representatives

References

External links
 
 
 

1964 births
Living people
Israeli female tennis players
Maccabiah Games medalists in tennis
Maccabiah Games silver medalists for Israel
Competitors at the 1981 Maccabiah Games
Sportspeople from Tel Aviv
United States International University alumni